Parliamentary elections were held in the People's Socialist Republic of Albania on 14 November 1982. The Democratic Front was the only party able to contest the elections, and subsequently won all 250 seats. Voter turnout was reported to be 100%.

Results

References

Parliamentary elections in Albania
Albania
1982 in Albania
One-party elections
Single-candidate elections
Albania